Growth arrest-specific protein 3 (GAS-3), also called peripheral myelin protein 22 (PMP22), is a protein which in humans is encoded by the PMP22 gene.

PMP22 is a 22 kDa transmembrane glycoprotein made up of 160 amino acids, and is mainly expressed in the Schwann cells of the peripheral nervous system. Schwann cells show high expression of PMP22, where it can constitute 2-5% of total protein content in compact myelin. Compact myelin is the bulk of the peripheral neuron's myelin sheath, a protective fatty layer that provides electrical insulation for the neuronal axon. The level of PMP22 expression is relatively low in the central nervous system of adults.

Like other membrane proteins, newly translated PMP22 protein is temporarily sequestered to the endoplasmic reticulum (ER) and Golgi apparatus for post-translational modifications. PMP22 protein is glycosylated with an N terminus-linked sugar and co-localized with the chaperone protein calnexin in the ER.  After the protein is transported to the Golgi apparatus it can then become incorporated in the plasma membrane of the cell.

Structure and function 
In humans, the PMP22 gene is located on chromosome 17p12 and spans approximately 40kb. The gene contains six exons conserved in both humans and rodents, two of which are 5’ untranslated exons (1a and 1b) and result in two different  RNA transcripts with identical coding sequences. The two transcripts differ in their 5' untranslated regions and have their own promoter regulating expression. The remaining exons (2 to 5) include the coding region of the PMP22 gene, and are joined together after post-transcriptional modification (i.e. alternative splicing). The PMP22 protein is characterized by four transmembrane domains, two extracellular loops (ECL1 and ECL2), and one intracellular loop. ECL1 has been suggested to mediate a homophilic interaction between two PMP22 proteins, whereas ECL2 has been shown to mediate a heterophilic interaction between PMP22 protein and Myelin protein zero (MPZ).

Although the PMP22 mechanism of action in myelinating Schwann cells is not fully known, it plays an essential role in the formation and maintenance of compact myelin. When Schwann cells come into contact with a neuronal axon, expression of PMP22 is significantly up-regulated, whereas PMP22 is down-regulated during  axonal degeneration or transection. PMP22 has shown association with zonula-occludens 1 and occludin, proteins that are involved in adhesion with other cells and the extracellular matrix, and also support functioning of myelin. Along with cell adhesion function, PMP22 is also up-regulated during Schwann cell proliferation, suggesting a role in cell-cycle regulation. PMP22 is detectable in non-neural tissues, where its expression has been shown to serve as growth-arrest-specific (gas-3) function.

Gene-dosage 
Improper gene dosage of the PMP22 gene can cause aberrant protein synthesis and function of myelin sheath. Since the components of myelin are stoichiometrically set, any irregular expression of a component can cause destabilization of myelin and neuropathic disorders. Alterations of PMP22 gene expression are associated with a variety of neuropathies, such as Charcot–Marie–Tooth type 1A (CMT1A), Dejerine–Sottas disease, and Hereditary Neuropathy with Liability to Pressure Palsy (HNPP). Too much PMP22 (e.g. caused by gene duplication) results in CMT1A, and too little PMP22 (e.g. caused by gene deletion) results in HNPP. Gene duplication of PMP22 is the most common genetic cause of CMT where the overproduction of PMP22 results in defects in multiple signalling pathways and dysfunction of transcriptional factors like KNOX20, SOX10 and EGR2.

Interactions 

Peripheral myelin protein 22 has been shown to interact with myelin protein zero.

References

Further reading

External links 
 GeneReviews/NCBI/NIH/UW entry on Charcot-Marie-Tooth Neuropathy Type 1